Sílvia Isabel Cruz (born 29 December 1980 in Lisbon) is a Portuguese javelin thrower. She set both a national record and a personal best throw of 59.76 metres at the first league of the European Athletics Cup in Leiria.

Cruz represented Portugal at the 2008 Summer Olympics in Beijing, where she competed for the women's javelin throw. She performed the best throw of 57.06 metres, on her second attempt, finishing twenty-fourth overall in the qualifying rounds.

Competition record

References

External links

NBC 2008 Olympics profile

Portuguese female javelin throwers
Living people
Olympic athletes of Portugal
Athletes (track and field) at the 2008 Summer Olympics
Athletes from Lisbon
1980 births